Feltwell is a village and civil parish in the English county of Norfolk.

History
Feltwell's name is of Anglo-Saxon origin and derives from the Old English for a spring or stream with an abundance of mullein.

Feltwell has good archaeological evidence for Roman settlement, including two unidentified buildings, two villas and two bathhouses which prove the wealth of Feltwell during the Roman era.

In the Domesday Book, Feltwell is listed as a settlement of 124 residents in the hundred of Grimshoe. In 1086, the village was divided between the East Anglian estates of King William I, William de Warenne and the Abbey of St Etheldreda, Ely.

In August 1382 the poet John Gower purchased the manors of Feltwell in Norfolk and Moulton in Suffolk. They were then granted to Thomas Blakelake, parson of St Nicholas's, Feltwell, and others, at a rent of £40 annually for his life.

Geography
According to the 2011 Census, Feltwell has a population of 2,825 residents living in 1,235 households.

St Nicholas Church

St Nicholas Church is a redundant church in the care of the Churches Conservation Trust. It is recorded in the National Heritage List for England as a designated Grade I listed building. St Nicholas was largely rebuilt in the nineteenth century, after the collapse of the tower in 1898, under the direction of Frederick Preedy. The church was used for Catholic Mass during the Second World War for prisoners of war.

St Mary's Church

Feltwell's active Church of England parish church, St Mary's, is also a Grade I listed building. It largely dates from the fifteenth century and was built after the site of earlier worship was severely damaged by fire. St Mary's displays East Anglia's finest examples of French stained-glass installed by the Parisian workshops of Édouard Didron and Eugene Oudinot, installed in the nineteenth century. The church was extended in the late-nineteenth century under the oversight, as with St Nicholas, of Frederick Preedy. 

Among the memorials in the church is one to Lt-Col. Edward G. Hibbert of the Grenadier Guards, a veteran of the Crimean War and the Battles of Alma, Inkerman and Sevastopol.

RAF Feltwell

RAF Feltwell opened in 1937 for use by the Royal Air Force and, during the Second World War, hosted the Vickers Wellingtons of No. 37, No. 57 and No. 75 Squadrons RAF on strategic bombing missions of Continental Europe. After the war, Feltwell hosted Thor ballistic missiles for the RAF and was later leased to the United States Air Force. Today, RAF Feltwell is used as an accommodation estate for American servicepeople based at RAF Mildenhall. The base is notable for its three radomes, resembling giant golf balls, that dominate the local countryside.

Amenities
Feltwell Primary School is named after Sir Edmund de Moundeford, a seventeenth-century Feltwell resident and politician. In 2022, the school was rated as 'Good' by Ofsted.

Feltwell's only remaining public house is called The Wellington, named after the Vickers Wellingtons that flew from RAF Feltwell during the Second World War, which dates from the eighteenth century and has in its history been used as a shop, an off-licence, a restaurant and, most recently, a wine-bar known as 'The Lodge.' The pub opened as The Wellington in 2014. The Chequers closed in 2017 having stood on its current site since the eighteenth century with significant renovation in 1930.

The village is also home to: a General Practice surgery & pharmacy; a veterinarian practice: a car garage and service station; two convenience stores; a hairdressers; a Chinese takeaway; a Fish and Chips takeaway and; a small amount of miscellaneous businesses close to the old snooker hall.

Notable residents
 John Gower (c.1330-1408)- English poet 
 Sir Edmund de Moundeford (1596-1643)- English politician

War memorial
Feltwell's war memorial takes the form of a marble Celtic cross above a plinth, located inside St Mary's churchyard. The memorial lists the following names for the First World War:

 Sgt. Edward Ellingford (d.1916), 12th (Rangers) Battalion, London Regiment
 Cpl. Arthur Southgate (d.1916), 9th Battalion, Royal Norfolk Regiment
 Cpl. Albert J. Spencer (1885-1918), 2/5th Battalion, Sherwood Foresters
 L-Cpl. Percy Wing (1888-1918), 2nd Battalion, Loyal Regiment
 L-Cpl. Albert E. Willett (1888-1917), 7th Battalion, Royal Norfolk Regiment
 Dvr. Thomas Smith (d.1918), 38th Reserve, Royal Army Service Corps
 Dvr. T. S. Norbury (d.1918), Royal Army Service Cps., att. 1/4th (London) Field Ambulance
 Gnr. Percy W. Wright (d.1918), 14th (Army) Brigade, Royal Field Artillery
 Gnr. Fred Cooper (1880-1916), 61st (Trench Mortar) Battery, Royal Garrison Artillery
 Pvt. Alfred Wilson (d.1918), 1st Field Ambulance, Royal Army Medical Corps
 Pvt. Ernest E. Laws (1885-1917), 11th Battalion, Border Regiment
 Pvt. William Peak (d.1914), 2nd Battalion, Coldstream Guards
 Pvt. Archibald Southgate (d.1917), 1st Battalion, Essex Regiment
 Pvt. Thomas W. Willett (1893-1915), 1st Bn., Essex Regt.
 Pvt. James W. Whistler (1879-1917), 13th Battalion, Royal Fusiliers
 Pvt. Sydney Payne (d.1917), 1st Battalion, Royal Inniskilling Fusiliers
 Pvt. Frederick J. Wilkin (d.1915), 1st Battalion, Lancashire Fusiliers
 Pvt. Frederick W. Brown (d.1916), 1st Battalion, Royal Norfolk Regiment
 Pvt. Bertie Coleman (d.1914), 1st Bn., Royal Norfolk Regt.
 Pvt. Percy Vale (d.1916), 1st Bn., Royal Norfolk Regt.
 Pvt. Adrian Bartlett (1896-1917), 3rd Battalion, Royal Norfolk Regt.
 Pvt. W. A. C. Wilkin (d.1919), 3rd Bn., Royal Norfolk Regt.
 Pvt. Harry E. Curtis (1895-1915), 9th Battalion, Royal Norfolk Regt.
 Pvt. Thomas W. Gent (1892-1916), 9th Bn., Royal Norfolk Regt.
 Pvt. Walter H. Bullen (d.1915), 1st Battalion, Queen's Royal Regiment
 Pvt. Frederick W. Upcraft (1892-1916), 2nd Battalion, Queen's Royal Regt.
 Pvt. Edwin G. Cracknell (d.1917), 11th Battalion, Suffolk Regiment
 Pvt. George A. Baxter (1895-1917), 2/7th Battalion, Worcestershire Regiment
 Pvt. Percy Banham (d.1918), 5th Battalion, Yorkshire Regiment
 Pvt. Charles W. Vincent (1881-1916), 9th Battalion, Yorkshire Regt.
 Rfn. John T. Rolfe (d.1917), 2nd Battalion, King's Royal Rifle Corps
 Sh-Smt. John E. Emmerson (1876-1917), 13th Brigade, Royal Horse Artillery
 C. W. Pearson

And, the following for the Second World War:
 Sgt. G. Roy White (d.1943), No. 103 Squadron RAF
 Ab-Smn. Henry G. Cordy (d.1940), [HMS Hostile (H55)|HMS Hostile]]
 L-Cpl. Edmund W. Lambert (1920-1944), Royal Pioneer Corps
 Pvt. Dorothy B. Lemon (1924-1942), Auxiliary Territorial Service, att. 151st (Heavy Anti-Aircraft) Regiment
 Pvt. Peter T. Lawrence (d.1945), Royal Norfolk Regiment
 Pvt. Francis A. Manning (1913-1941), 6th Battalion, Royal Norfolk Regt.
 Pvt. F. W. Reeve (1910-1944), 1/6th Battalion, Queen's Royal Regiment
 Tel. Raymond B. Walden (d.1940), HMS Salmon
 A. H. Brown

References

External links

 
Villages in Norfolk
Civil parishes in Norfolk
King's Lynn and West Norfolk